Gender empowerment is the empowerment of people of any gender. While conventionally, the aspect of it is mentioned for empowerment of women, the concept stresses the distinction between biological sex and gender as a role, also referring to other marginalized genders in a particular political or social context.

Gender empowerment has become a significant topic of discussion in regard to development and economics. Entire nations, businesses, communities, and groups can benefit from the implementation of programs and policies that adopt the notion of women empowerment. Empowerment is one of the main procedural concerns when addressing human rights and development. The Human Development and Capabilities Approach, The Millennium Development Goals, and other credible approaches/goals point to empowerment and participation as a necessary step if a country is to overcome the obstacles associated with poverty and development.

Measuring 
Gender empowerment can be measured through the Gender Empowerment Measure, or the GEM. The GEM shows women's participation in a given nation, both politically and economically. Gem is calculated by tracking "the share of seats in parliament held by women; of female legislators, senior officials and managers; and of female profession and technical workers; and the gender disparity in earned income, reflecting economic independence." It then ranks countries given this information. Other measures that take into account the importance of female participation and equality include: the Gender Parity Index and the Gender Development Index (GDI).

See also 
 Anti-gender movement
 Gender and politics
 Gender diversity
 Gender equality
 Gender essentialism
 Sociology of gender
 Women's empowerment

References  

Gender equality
Human rights concepts
Law and economics
Sexuality and gender identity-based cultures
Law by issue
Egalitarianism
Empowerment
Gender and society
Feminism and society
Control (social and political)
Social privilege